Abdel Aziz Emam (born 22 May 1989) is an Egyptian footballer who plays for Aswan SC as a midfielder.

References

External links
Abdel Aziz Emam at Footballdatabase

1989 births
Living people
Egyptian footballers
Place of birth missing (living people)
Egyptian Premier League players
Association football midfielders
El Dakhleya SC players
Smouha SC players
Al Aluminium SC players
Petrojet SC players
Al Nasr Lel Taa'den SC players
Aswan SC players